Vainikolo is a surname. Notable people with the surname include:

Fetu'u Vainikolo (born 1985), Tongan rugby union player
Lesley Vainikolo (born 1979), New Zealand/English rugby union player
Vainikolo Taumoepeau (born 1700s?), Originator of the Taumoepeau's and a legendary Tongan Warrior. Originally spelled with a 'W', 'Wainikolo' being the Fijian spelling, as Taumoepeau a descendant of mixed Fijian/Tongan ancestry.